

Trinity School of Ministry, previously Trinity School of Theology, is a non-denominational Bible training centre in Rugby, Warwickshire. Originally based in Swansea, Wales, it was founded in 1924 by Rees Howells and was formerly known as The Bible College of Wales before it was relocated from Wales to England. It is run by Global Horizons, and continues to align itself with the legacy of Rees Howells, who was involved in intercession for many years, before seeing revival across Southern Africa from 1915 to 1920. He became well known as an intercessor, after the success of his life story, Rees Howells Intercessor by Norman Grubb. 

The Trinity School of Ministry offers a variety of courses, ranging from short term courses to degree study (both full time and part time). Its degree programme is accredited by York St John University, and aims to combine practical ministry training and sound theological study in their courses.

Today, the website of Trinity School of Ministry is no longer existent and the Global Horizons website redirects to Lifelink International. There are little updates concerning the developments of the Trinity School of Ministry.

Legacy of Rees Howells 
Returning to Britain, he felt called by the Holy Spirit to start a Bible College; his inspiration being the 900 student capacity Moody Bible Institute in Chicago, Illinois. It formally opened at Glynderwen House, Swansea, UK in 1924. The estate had originally been owned by the Giles family.

Rees Howells was director of the college until his death in 1950. He was succeeded by his son Samuel Rees Howells who led the college until a year before his death in 2004. Alan Scotland was hand-picked by Samuel to lead the college into a new era.

Richard Maton, worked under the ministry of Samuel Howells for forty-seven years and has fully documented the history of the Bible College of Wales in his book Samuel, Son and Successor of Rees Howells. Included in his book are over 110 photos, many of Rees and Samuel Howells in the grounds of the Bible College.

Glynderwen House was closed down in 2006, and all the buildings were demolished. The college retained two sites on Derwen Fawr Road, Sketty, Swansea, SA2 8EB, which were purchased by Rees Howells. These two sites were put on the property market in late 2010. 

In July 2009 the Bible College of Wales run by Global Horizons at that time, saw its last graduation. In September 2009, the college operations moved to Rugby under the name Trinity School of Ministry.

In December 2012, Cornerstone Community Church of Singapore purchased the Derwen Fawr site and announced intentions to establish a new Bible school on the site while retaining its original name and honouring its heritage and legacy. The Bible College of Wales was reopened and inaugurated on Whit Monday, 2015 under the new leadership.

Notable alumni 
 Reinhard Bonnke
 Evangelist Charles W Doss

Bibliography 
Samuel, Son and Successor of Rees Howells, by Richard Maton, ByFaith Media, 2012. Covers the story of how the Bible College of Wales was founded, and its full history.
Samuel Rees Howells: A Life of Intercession, The Legacy of Prayer and Spiritual Warfare of an Intercessor by Richard Maton. Covering the prayers of the Bible College of Wales 1939-2002 and the move from Swansea, to Trinity School of Ministry.

References 
Pray and Intercession

External links 
Trinity School of Ministry - official site
Rees Howells The Life of Rees Howells
Bible College of Wales - official site
Bible College of Wales - Cornerstone Community Church
Rees Howells, Intercessor DVD Official DVD on the life of Rees Howells
Samuel, Son and Successor of Rees Howells. The full history of the Bible College of Wales, with many photos of Rees and Samuel Howells, plus the College buildings.
Samuel Rees Howells: A Life of Intercession. The Legacy of Prayer and Spiritual Warfare of an Intercessor by Richard Maton. Covering the prayers of the Bible College of Wales, and the reasons for the move to Trinity School of Ministry 1939-2002.

Further education colleges in Swansea
1924 establishments in Wales
Bible colleges, seminaries and theological colleges in Wales
Bible colleges, seminaries and theological colleges in England